Albert Moeller Samuel (7 June 1876 – 18 June 1963) was a Reform Party Member of Parliament in New Zealand.

He was elected to the  electorate in the 1925 general election. In 1928 he was elected to the Thames electorate, but was defeated in 1935.

Prior to his tenure as an electoral MP, Samuel fought in the Second Boer War in the 4th Contingent of the Mounted Rifles. He was a member of the NZEF during World War 1 and served as a major in the Wellington Mounted Rifles. He was decorated with the following honours:

 1914-15 Star
 British War Medal
 Victory Medal with oak leaf
 Colonial Auxiliary Forces Decoration
 Long and Efficient Services Decoration

In 1935, he was awarded the King George V Silver Jubilee Medal.

References

1876 births
1963 deaths
Members of the New Zealand House of Representatives
New Zealand MPs for North Island electorates
Reform Party (New Zealand) MPs
Unsuccessful candidates in the 1935 New Zealand general election